Cristian García Ramos (born 21 December 1981), known simply as Cristian, is a Spanish former professional footballer who played as a right-back, currently manager of FC Vilafranca.

His career was mainly associated to Terrassa, as both a player and a manager. He played 390 games in the Segunda División over 13 seasons, scoring a total of 17 goals for seven clubs.

Playing career
Born in Terrassa, Barcelona, Catalonia, Cristian began playing with local Terrassa FC's first team at the age of 18. In the 2001–02 season, he contributed 33 appearances as the club returned to Segunda División after 23 years.

Cristian played his first match as a professional on 31 August 2002, starting in a 1–1 home draw against Albacete Balompié. He scored his first league goal the following 7 June, helping to a 2–2 away draw with Elche CF. Also during that campaign, he found the net in a 4–2 loss at Real Madrid in the Copa del Rey.

In 2005, following Terrassa's relegation, Cristian signed with Polideportivo Ejido also in the second division. In his second year in Andalusia, he only missed one game in 42 as his team finished in 11th position.

Cristian joined Cádiz CF for 2007–08, being relegated but managing to promote from Segunda División B the following year. In the 2009–10 season, with 37 matches and two goals from the player, they again dropped down a level.

In the following six years, Cristian continued competing in division two, with SD Ponferradina, Córdoba CF, CE Sabadell FC and CD Tenerife. He was relegated with the first club in his only season, and the third in 2015. Whilst at the service of Córdoba, he suffered a severe anterior cruciate ligament injury which sidelined him for nearly one year.

On 6 July 2016, the 34-year-old Cristian returned to Terrassa, now in the Tercera División.

Coaching career
On 31 May 2017, former Terrassa player and director of football Cristian retired for good from football and was immediately appointed the manager of the first team, still in the fourth tier. In May 2019, he left.

References

External links

Stats and bio at Cadistas1910 

1981 births
Living people
Spanish footballers
Footballers from Terrassa
Association football defenders
Segunda División players
Segunda División B players
Tercera División players
Terrassa FC footballers
Polideportivo Ejido footballers
Cádiz CF players
SD Ponferradina players
Córdoba CF players
CE Sabadell FC footballers
CD Tenerife players
Spanish football managers
Tercera División managers
Tercera Federación managers
Terrassa FC managers
UE Sant Andreu managers